Dream Logic is an album by Norwegian guitarist Eivind Aarset.

Review 
On this album where Aarset alone heaps up layers of guitars, bass and percussion, totally integrated with the processing and programming constituting a dream like landscape, with tasteful creative contributions from producer Jan Bang, known from the annual Punkt festival in Kristiansand, with his samples and effects, here in  collaborations with Erik Honoré, who mixed this album together with Jan Bang and Jan Erik Kongshaug. In spite of the technology the guitar sound is naked as can be, and the music reveals the full breadth of the flowing, imaginative and unorthodox performance of Aarset. He delivers an album in a soft mode, that keeps coming so close to silence without ever actually reaching it, with great depth, dark shades and trance generating twists. Dream Logic is a tastefully sensitive masterpiece from this style finished guitarist who constantly amazes with his ability to find new exciting soundscapes.

Reception 
The Independent review awarded the album 4 stars, the Allmusic.com review awarded the album 4 stars, and the review of the Norwegian newspaper Dagbladet awarded the album dice 5.

Track listing 
«Close (For Comfort)» (06:34)
«Surrender» (04:21)
«Jukai (Sea of Trees)» (03:45)
«Black Silence» (04:03)
«Active» (03:20)
«Close (Variation I)» (02:39)
«Reactive» (02:21)
«Homage to Greene» (05:29)
«The Whispering Forest» (05:42)
«Close (Variation II)» (01:43)
«The Beauty of Decay» (07:06)

Personnel 
Eivind Aarset - guitars, bass guitar, electronics, percussion, samples, programming
Jan Bang - samples, dictaphone, programming
Audun Kleive - log drum sample (track 9)

Credits 
Recorded and mixed 2011/12 at Punkt Studio and Tjernsbråtan by Jan Bang, Erik Honoré, and Jan Erik Kongshaug
Mastering: Jan Erik Kongshaug, Rainbow Studio
Produced by Jan Bang

References

External links 
Eivind Aarset on Kalleklev.no
Eivind Aarset Official Website

2012 albums
Eivind Aarset albums
ECM Records albums